Estavana Polman (born 5 August 1992) is a Dutch handball player for CS Rapid București and the Dutch national team.

She represented the Netherlands in younger age categories as well and collected the silver medal at the 2011 Women's 19 European Handball Championship. In addition, she was voted into the all-star team of the tournament in playmaker position.

Personal life
As of August 2016, she is in a relationship with Dutch footballer Rafael van der Vaart.

On 27 December 2016, they announced that they are expecting a child.

On 24 June 2017, she gave birth to a 3 kg baby girl, Jesslynn.

Honours
Danish Championship:
: 2016
: 2019
: 2020
: 2015

Awards and recognition
All-Star Playmaker of the Women's 19 European Championship: 2011
Danish League Top Scorer: 2013, 2014, 2019
All-Star Left Back of the Danish League: 2019
MVP of the World Championship: 2019
 All Star Best player of the Danish 1st Division: 2011/12
All-Star Centre Back of the World Championship: 2019

References

External links

1992 births
Living people
Sportspeople from Arnhem
Dutch female handball players
Expatriate handball players
Dutch expatriate sportspeople in Denmark
Handball players at the 2016 Summer Olympics
Olympic handball players of the Netherlands
21st-century Dutch women
Association footballers' wives and girlfriends